Clifford W.  Bell (July 2, 1896 – April 13, 1952) was an American pitcher in Negro league baseball. He played for the Kansas City Monarchs, Memphis Red Sox, and Cleveland Cubs from 1921 to 1931.

Bell was described as a "quiet" man, who rarely spoke to his teammates. His best pitch was reportedly the screwball, and he was normally used as a middle reliever.

References

External links
 and Seamheads

1896 births
Kansas City Monarchs players
Memphis Red Sox players
Baseball players from Texas
People from Cass County, Texas
1952 deaths
20th-century African-American sportspeople